"Hurts" is a song by Scottish recording artist Emeli Sandé, released as the lead single from her second album Long Live the Angels (2016) on 16 September 2016 through Virgin EMI Records in the United Kingdom. It was written by Sandé along with James Murray, Mustafa Omer, Matthew Holmes, and Philip Leigh, with production helmed by Mojam and duo Mac & Phil. Built around layers of percussion and double quick hand claps, the song peaked at number 22 on the UK Singles Chart and reached the top five in Scotland.

Music video
An accompanying music video for "Hurts", directed by Dawn Shadforth, was released on 5 October 2016.

Track listing

Charts

Certifications and sales

Release history

References

External links
 EmeliSande.com — Official website

2016 songs
2016 singles
Emeli Sandé songs
Songs written by Emeli Sandé
Songs written by Mustafa Omer